Sivala is a village located in the East Godavari district of Andhra Pradesh, India.

References

Villages in East Godavari district